The Centrophoridae are a family of squaliform sharks. The family contains just two genera and about 15 species. They are sometimes called gulper sharks, but this is also the name of a specific species in the family, Centrophorus granulosus.
These are generally deepwater fish.  While some, such as the gulper shark C. granulosus, are found worldwide and fished commercially, others are uncommon and little-known.  Their usual prey is other fish; some are known to feed on squid, octopus, and shrimp.  Some species live on the bottom (benthic), while others are pelagic. They are ovoviviparous, with the female retaining the egg-cases in her body until they hatch.

The members of the genus Deania generally have a long flattened snout.

Species
The 18 known species are grouped into two genera:

 Centrophorus J. P. Müller & Henle, 1837
 Centrophorus atromarginatus Garman, 1913 (dwarf gulper shark)
 Centrophorus granulosus (Bloch & J. G. Schneider, 1801). (gulper shark)
 Centrophorus harrissoni McCulloch, 1915 (dumb gulper shark)
 Centrophorus isodon (Y. T. Chu, Q. W. Meng & J. X. Liu, 1981) (blackfin gulper shark)
 Centrophorus lusitanicus Barbosa du Bocage & Brito Capello, 1864 (lowfin gulper shark)
 Centrophorus moluccensis Bleeker, 1860 (smallfin gulper shark)
 Centrophorus seychellorum Baranes, 2003 (Seychelles gulper shark)
 Centrophorus squamosus (Bonnaterre, 1788) (leafscale gulper shark)
 Centrophorus tessellatus Garman, 1906 (mosaic gulper shark)
 Centrophorus uyato Rafinesque, 1810 (Little gulper shark)
 Centrophorus westraliensis W. T. White, Ebert & Compagno, 2008 (western gulper shark)
 Centrophorus zeehaani W. T. White, Ebert & Compagno, 2008 (southern dogfish)
 Centrophorus sp. A (minigulper)
 Centrophorus sp. B (slender gulper)
 Deania D. S. Jordan & Snyder, 1902
 Deania calcea (R. T. Lowe, 1839) (birdbeak dogfish)
 Deania hystricosa (Garman, 1906) (rough longnose dogfish)
 Deania profundorum (H. M. Smith & Radcliffe, 1912) (arrowhead dogfish)
 Deania quadrispinosa (McCulloch, 1915) (longsnout dogfish)

References

External links
 FishBase entry for Centrophoridae

 
Shark families
Taxa named by Pieter Bleeker